Tamas and Juli  is a 1997 Hungarian romantic film directed by Ildikó Enyedi for the 2000, Seen By... project.

Plot
In a small town, Tamas, a coal miner, meets Juli, a kindergarten teacher, and begins dating her. Their first dates are always disrupted, but they end with a date on New Year's Eve, 1999.

Production
The film was produced for the 2000, Seen By... project, initiated by the French company Haut et Court to produce films depicting the approaching turn of the millennium seen from the perspectives of 10 different countries.

Reception
Deborah Young of Variety called Tamas and Juli "a slight but sensitively handled love story," and "a decent, warmhearted examination of the difficulties of young love." Ted Shen of the Chicago Reader writes that Enyedi "communicates romance elliptically, through the lovers' hesitations, doleful expressions, and broad smiles."

References

External links

Tamás és Juli at Rotten Tomatoes

1997 films
Films directed by Ildikó Enyedi
Hungarian romance films
1990s romance films